The White Bird Marked with Black is a 1971 Soviet period drama film directed by Yuri Ilyenko. It was entered into the 7th Moscow International Film Festival and won the Golden Prize.

Plot
The plot takes place between 1937 and 1947, in a little, traditional Hutsul village in Northern Bukovina. The Zvonars are a poor family of musicians, who eke out a living by performing in the local celebrations. Both older brothers, Petro and Orest, are in love with Dana, the priest's beautiful daughter. Their younger brother, Heorhii, is a dreamlike adolescent who is attracted to the village's witch, Vivdya. In 1940, the Romanian authorities cede the territory to the Soviets. Dana falls for a Red Army officer named Ostap and decides to marry him. On the day of their wedding, the Germans and Romanians invade. Ostap has to return to his unit, and Petro leaves the band to join the Red Army. Orest seduces Dana and takes her to the mountains, where he joins the Ukrainian nationalists and subsequently, the Ukrainian Insurgent Army. After three years of brutal Romanian occupation, Ostap and Petro return as the Soviets retake the area. They attempt to introduce progress, bringing the villagers a modern tractor. Dana abandons Orest and returns to the village. He ties Ostap to the tractor and sets it aflame; Petro attempts to save him, but both die. When he visits a wedding to dance with Dana, older Heorhii and the villagers finally decide to confront him. He commits suicide when he is cornered. Heorhii studies medicine and becomes a doctor under the new Soviet system.

Cast
 Larisa Kadochnikova as Dana
 Oleg Polstvin as child Heorhii
 Mykhailo Illienko as Heorhii
 Ivan Mykolaychuk as Petro
 Bohdan Stupka as Orest
 Yuri Mikolaychuk as Bohdan
 Natalya Naum as Katrina
 Dzhemma Firsova as Vivdya
 Aleksandr Plotnikov as Les Zvonar
 Vasili Simchich as Father Miron
 Leonid Bakshtayev as Ostap
 Vladimir Shakalo as Pan Levitsky
 Nikolai Olejnik as Roman (the role voiced actor Pavel Morozenko)

Production
The White Bird Marked with Black was conceived by lead actor and screenwriter Ivan Mykolaychuk in 1969. On 6 May 1969, he met with director Yuri Ilyenko and offered him to compose a script based on his idea. Ilyenko accepted, and the two ended their work on the screenplay by 15 June. They submitted it to the Dovzhenko Film Studios: member of the board Leonid Osyka, who had previously cooperated with Ilyenko, praised the script and convinced the other studio bosses to take it in. It was then forwarded to the State Cinema Committee of the Ukrainian SSR, which authorized it without delay in spite of the politically sensitive topic. Yevhen Khrinyuk, the studio's artistic director, used his connections to have the authorities in Moscow give the final approval. On 16 September, the Dovzhenko Studios signed a contract with the writers and production commenced. Ilyenko's White Bird was meant to be "Ukraine's showcase film for the 25th Anniversary of Victory Day".

Mikolaychuk intended to portray Orest, the brother who became a Ukrainian nationalist and served as antagonist, and wrote the character for himself, turning it to the most developed and multi-layered in the film. In comparison, Communist Petro was superficial. This element was detected by members of the Ukrainian Communist Party's Central Committee who reviewed the script: subsequently, Goskino refused to allow the actor to have the role, and young Bohdan Stupka received it.

References

Bibliography
First, Joshua J. Scenes of Belonging: Cinema and the Nationality Question in Soviet Ukraine During the Long 1960s. ProQuest (2008). .

External links
 
  Film review

1970 films
1970 drama films
Soviet drama films
Dovzhenko Film Studios films
Soviet-era Ukrainian films
Films set in Ukraine
Soviet multilingual films
1970s multilingual films
Ukrainian drama films
1971 drama films